Bab al-Hadid meaning the Iron Gate of Victory, is one of the nine historical gates of the Ancient City of Aleppo, Syria. It is one of the well-preserved gates of old Aleppo.

History
The gate was planned during the reign of Az-Zahir Ghazi and built by his son Mohammed as Bab al-Qanat (the Aqueduct Gate). It was rebuilt by the final Mamluk sultan Al-Ashraf Qansuh al-Ghawri in 1509. 

The gate and surrounding quarters of the old city are some of the best preserved areas in the old city of Aleppo. It was historically known for its blacksmiths and to this day, there are some operating with the same traditional practices, most of whom have had the trade in their family for many generations.

Restoration of the damaged gate began in September 2020 and was completed in 2021.

References

External links
 Damage to Bab al-Hadid during the Syrian Civil War, documented on the Facebook page of Le patrimoine archéologique syrien en danger الآثار السورية في خطر

Hadid